The 1988 VCU Rams baseball team represented Virginia Commonwealth University during the 1988 NCAA Division I baseball season. The Rams played their home games at The Diamond as a member of the Sun Belt Conference. They led by head coach Tony Guzzo, in his sixth season with the program.

Offseason

1987 MLB Draft

Game log

Awards and honors

References 

Vcu
VCU Rams baseball seasons
VCU Rams baseball
Vcu